Paul Savage may refer to:
 Paul Savage (actor) (born 1962), American actor 
 Paul Savage (musician) (born 1971), Scottish musician and record producer
 Paul Savage (bobsleigh) (born 1935), American bobsledder
 Paul Savage (curler) (born 1947), Canadian curler

See also
 Paul Sauvage (disambiguation)